The 2010–11 season will be Lombard-Pápa TFC's 4th competitive season, 2nd consecutive season in the Soproni Liga and 15th year in existence as a football club.

Team kit
The team kits for the 2010–11 season are produced by Jako and sponsored by Lombard. The home kit is yellow and black colour and the away kit is blue and black colour.

Club

Coaching staff

Top scorers
Includes all competitive matches. The list is sorted by shirt number when total goals are equal.

Last updated on 20 November 2010

Disciplinary record
Includes all competitive matches. Players with 1 card or more included only.

Last updated on 20 November 2010

Overall
{|class="wikitable"
|-
|Games played || 17 (15 Soproni Liga, 2 Hungarian Cup and 0 Hungarian League Cup)
|-
|Games won || 8 (7 Soproni Liga, 1 Hungarian Cup and 0 Hungarian League Cup)
|-
|Games drawn ||  2 (1 Soproni Liga, 1 Hungarian Cup and 0 Hungarian League Cup)
|-
|Games lost ||  7 (7 Soproni Liga, 0 Hungarian Cup and 0 Hungarian League Cup)
|-
|Goals scored || 28
|-
|Goals conceded || 29
|-
|Goal difference || −1
|-
|Yellow cards || 36
|-
|Red cards || 3
|-
|rowspan="4"|Worst discipline ||  Attila Rajnay (4 , 0 )
|-
|  Attila Farkas (4 , 0 )
|-
|  Denys Rebryk (4 , 0 )
|-
|  Zsolt Bárányos (4 , 0 )
|-
|rowspan="1"|Best result || 5–1 (H) v Szombathelyi Haladás – Nemzeti Bajnokság I – 20-08-2010
|-
|rowspan="1"|Worst result || 0–5 (H) v Ferencvárosi TC – Nemzeti Bajnokság I – 20-11-2010
|-
|rowspan="2"|Most appearances ||  Lajos Szűcs (17 appearances)
|-
|  Zsolt Bárányos (17 appearances)
|-
|rowspan="1"|Top scorer ||  Goran Marić (6 goals)
|-
|Points || 26/51 (50.98%)
|-

Nemzeti Bajnokság I

Classification

Results summary

Results by round

Matches

Debreceni VSC: Verpecz – Z. Nagy, Simac, I. Szűcs, Korhut – Bódi, Ramos, Rezes (Czvitkovics 61.), T. Kulcsár (Dombi 56.) – Kabát (B. Farkas 56.), P. Szilágyi. Coach: András Herczeg.
Lombard-Pápa TFC: L. Szűcs – G. Tóth, A. Farkas, Supic (P. Bíró 33.), Rajnay – Zulevs, Gyömbér, Bárányos (Jovánczai 46.), N. Heffler (Germán 59.), N. Tóth – Abwo. Coach: György Véber.
G.: P. Szilágyi (18.), T. Kulcsár (32.)
Y.: Rajnay (64.), A. Farkas (82.)

Lombard-Pápa TFC: Szűcs – Venczel (Rebryk 56.), G. Tóth, Farkas, Rajnay – Quintero, Gyömbér, Heffler – Abwo (Germán 62.), Bárányos (Jovánczai 80.), N. Tóth. Coach: György Véber.
Szolnoki MÁV FC: Tarczy – Hevesi-Tóth, Hegedűs, Pető, Cornaci – Tchami (Vörös 73.), Molnár, Remili (Antal 80.), Búrány, Koós (Ngalle 65.) – Alex. Coach: Attila Vágó.
G.: —
Y.: N. Tóth (49.) – Cornaci (40.), Hegedűs (61.), Búrány (80.), Ngalle (85.)

Zalaegerszegi TE: Vlaszák – Panikvar, Kovács (Kocsárdi 61.), Bogunovic, Varga – Szalai, Kamber, Máté, Illés (A. Horváth 65.) – Rajcomar (Delic 84.), Pavicevic. Coach: János Csank.
Lombard-Pápa TFC: Szűcs – Venczel (Rebryk 57.), Dlusztus, Bíró, Németh – Quintero, Farkas, Germán – Abwo, Bárányos, Maric. Coach: György Véber.
G.: Rajcomar (26.), Pavicevic (42., 90. – pen.) – Abwo (12.)
Y.: Pavicevic (84.) – Dlusztus (10.), Quintero (60.), Rebryk (75.)

Lombard-Pápa TFC: Szűcs – Takács (Rebryk 72.), Bíró, Farkas, Rajnay (Venczel 58.) – Quintero, Gyömbér, Heffler – Abwo (Germán 79.), Bárányos, Maric. Coach: György Véber.
Szombathelyi Haladás: Rózsa – Schimmer, Guzmics, Lengyel, Tóth (Csontos 84.) – Rajos, Molnár, Á. Simon – Nagy, Kenesei (Lattenstein 62.), Oross (Rácz 84.). Coach: Aurél Csertői.
G.: Bárányos (32. – pen), Maric (50., 88.), Germán (81.), Gyömbér (84. – pen) – Tóth (22.)
Y.: Rajnay (25.), Rebryk (74.) – Á. Simon (17.), Lengyel (34.), Rajos (50.)
R.: Nagy (56.), Molnár (57.), Lattenstein (68.)

Kaposvári Rákóczi FC: Kovács – Okuka, Grúz, Zsók, Gujic – Godslove (Pavlovic 50.), Balázs (Kulcsár 50.), Lipusz, Hegedűs, Oláh – Peric (Szepessy 87.). Coach: Tibor Sisa.
Lombard-Pápa TFC: Szűcs – Quintero (Zulevs 71.), Bíró, Farkas, P. Takács – Németh, Gyömbér, Jovánczai (Rebryk 62.) – Abwo, Bárányos, Maric (Venczel 83.). Coach: György Véber.
G.: Grúz (84.), Kulcsár (87.), Zsók (92.) – Abwo (36.), P. Takács (79.)
Y.: Grúz (50.), Kulcsár (68.) – Bárányos (32.)
R.: P. Takács (83.)

Paksi SE: Csernyánszki – Sifter, Fiola, Éger (Böde 71.), Csehi – Heffler, Kiss (Mészáros 86.), Sipeki – Bartha (Báló 89.), Montvai, Vayer.. Coach: Károly Kis.
Lombard-Pápa TFC: Szűcs – Rajnay, Bíró, Farkas, Takács – Quintero (Rebryk 51.), Gyömbér, Heffler – Abwo, Bárányos, Maric (Bali 80.). Coach: György Véber.
G.: Bartha (43., 87.), Vayer (49.), Montvai (68.)
Y.: Rajnay (26.), Rebryk (88.)

Lombard-Pápa TFC: Szűcs – Takács (Venczel 90.+9), Farkas, Bíró, Németh – Quintero, Gyömbér, Heffler – Abwo (Rebryk 33.), Bárányos, Maric (Jovánczai 90.+2). Coach: György Véber.
Kecskeméti TE – Ereco: Holczer – Bori, Gyagya, Lambulic, Balogh (Mohl 55.) – Ebala, Cukic, Koncz (Savic 72.), Alempijevic (Csordás 46.) – Litsingi, Tököli. Coach: István Urbányi.
G.: Gyömbér (8.), Takács (13.), Rebryk (40.), Heffler (90.+8) – Gyagya (11.)
Y.: Gyömbér (30.), Heffler (72.) – Holczer (40.), Bori (43.), Lambulic (45.), Koncz (63.)

Budapest Honvéd FC: Kemenes – Takács, Cuerda, Debreceni, Hajdú – Abass, Coira, Akassou (Conteh 77.), Sadjo (Rufino 65.) – Rouani, Danilo. Coach: Massimo Morales.
Lombard-Pápa TFC: Szűcs – Takács, Bíró, Farkas, Németh – Quintero, Gyömbér, Bárányos – Abwo (Rebryk 65.), Heffler (Venczel 92.), Maric. Coach: György Véber.
G.: Abass (26., 61.) – Maric (7.), Bárányos (22., 57.), Heffler (72.)
Y.: Takács (60.), Cuerda (90.) – Farkas (51.), Heffler (60.)
R.: Cuerda (92.)

Lombard-Pápa TFC: Szűcs – Takács, Bíró (Bali 84.), Farkas, Rajnay (Tóth 64.) – Quintero (Rebryk 46.), Gyömbér, Bárányos – Abwo, Maric, Heffler. Coach: György Véber.
Videoton FC Fehérvár: Bozovic – Lázár (Vasiljevic 46.), Lipták, Vaskó, Andic – Nagy, Farkas, Sándor, Elek, Polonkai (Milanovic 91.) – Alves (Djordjic 94.). Coach: György Mezey.
G.: Heffler (55.) – Elek (18.), Alves (45.)
Y.: Rajnay (27.), Maric (55.), Tóth (85.), Szűcs (92.) – Bozovic (55.), Lipták (64.), Nagy (86.), Vaskó (87.)
R.: Elek (92.)

Győri ETO FC: Stevanovic – Tokody (Fehér 29.), Djordjevic, Stanisic, Szabó – Koltai, Trajkovic (Ganugrava 62.), Pilibaitis, Völgyi (Ceolin 61.) – Bouguerra, Aleksidze. Coach: Attila Pintér.
Lombard-Pápa TFC: Szűcs – Takács, Supic, Farkas, Németh – Rebryk (Quintero 87.), Gyömbér, Bárányos. Zulevs (Abwo 57.) – Maric, Heffler (Tóth 92.). Coach: György Véber.
G.: Abwo (81.)
Y.: Trajkovic (8.), Djordjevic (64.) – Maric (38.), Farkas (44.)
R:: Djordjevic (79.)

Lombard-Pápa TFC: Szűcs – Takács, Farkas, Supic, Németh – Gyömbér, Heffler (G. Tóth 83.), Rebryk (Quintero 75.) – Abwo, Bárányos (N. Tóth 88.), Maric. Coach: György Véber.
Újpest FC: Balajcza – Szokol, Takács, Vermes, Pollák – Simek, Mitrovic, Egerszegi (Böőr 46.), Simon (Barczi 62.) – Tisza, Rajczi (Matos 65.). Coach: Géza Mészöly.
G.: Vermes (4. – og.), Maric (69.), Heffler (82.) – Tisza (72.)
Y.: Supic (43.), Gyömbér (75.) – Takács (77.), Barczi (84.)

BFC Siófok: Molnár – Márton, Fehér, Graszl, László – Ribeiro, Tusori (Délczeg 60.), Ludánszki, Lukács (Ivanovics 57.) – Homma, Sowunmi. Coach: István Mihalecz.
Lombard-Pápa TFC: Szűcs – Takács (N. Tóth 46.), Supic (G. Tóth 33.), A. Farkas, Németh – Heffler (Quintero 73.), Gyömbér, Rebryk – Abwo, Bárányos, Maric. Coach: György Véber.
G.: Maric (53.)
Y.: Graszl (29.) – N. Tóth (89.)

Lombard-Pápa TFC: Szűcs – Takács (Quintero 46.), Farkas, Supic, Németh – Heffler (N. Tóth 70.), Gyömbér, Rebryk – Abwo (G. Tóth 83.), Bárányos, Maric. Coach: György Véber.
Vasas SC: Végh – Balog, Gáspár, Mileusnic (Hrepka 73.), Polényi – Arsic, Bakos, Németh (Pavicevic 66.), Mundi (Beliczky 85.) – Lázok, Ferenczi. Coach: András Komjáti.
G.: Lázok (6. – o.g.), Maric (66.) – Ferenczi (15.)
Y.: Farkas (90.) – Balog (69.)

MTK Budapest FC: Szatmári – Vukadinovic, Szekeres, Sütő (Pátkai 66.), Vadnai – Szabó (Nikházi 73.), Vukmir, Kanta, Ladányi, Könyves – Tischler (Eppel 46.). Coach: József Garami.
Lombard-Pápa TFC: Szűcs – Takács (Quintero 58.), Farkas, Supic, Németh – Rebryk, Gyömbér, Bárányos – Abwo, Maric, Heffler (N. Tóth 18.). Coach: György Véber.
G.: Könyves (75.), Eppel (79.) – Abwo (17.)
Y.: Szabó (43.) – Bárányos (43.), Takács (55.)

Lombard-Pápa TFC: Szűcs – G. Tóth, Farkas, Supic, Németh – Rebryk, Gyömbér, Bárányos, N. Tóth (Palkó 65.) – Abwo (Quintero 55.), Maric (Jovánczai 13.). Coach: György Véber.
Ferencvárosi TC: Haber – Balog, Csizmadia, Rodenbücher – Rósa, Józsi, Maróti, Andrezinho (Dragóner 83.) – Schembri (Tóth 77.), Heinz, Miljkovic (Morales 67.). Coach: László Prukner.
G.: Schembri (18., 27., 76.), Heinz (40.), Morales (75.)
Y.: Bárányos (28.), Németh (85.) – Andrezinho (6.), Rodenbücher (9.), Csizmadia (80.), Tóth (88.)

Hungarian Cup

Third round

Győri ETO FC II: Radosavljevic – Nagy, Bieder, Totadze (Paget 70.), Vető – Windecker, Molnár, Kiss (Horváth 46.), Berde – Simon (Varga 55.), Ahjupera. Coach: István Klement.
Lombard-Pápa TFC: Szűcs – Dlusztus, Karácsony – Bárányos, Gyömbér, Heffler, Németh, Quintero (Zulevs 92.), Rebryk, Takács – Maric (Jovánczai 67.; Bali 85.). Coach: György Véber.
G.: Berde (59.) – Rebryk (35.), Quintero (91.)
Y.: Simon (42.), Berde (66.) – Németh (11.), Karácsony (30.), Maric (66.), Jovánczai (85.)
R.: Nagy (88.)

Fourth round

Gyirmót SE: Deli – Kiss, Kozmér, Böjte, Varga (Pirka 81.) – Czanik, Baumgartner, B. Tóth (Horváth 113.), Nagy – Laki, Weitner (N. Tóth 74.). Coach: Jószef Kiprich.
Lombard-Pápa TFC: Szűcs – G. Tóth (Quintero 57.), Heffler, Abwo, Takács – Gyömbér, Rebryk (Dlusztus 46.), Bárányos, Maric (Zulevs 78.) – Supic, Németh. Coach: György Véber.
G.: Laki (45.+1) – Bárányos (2. – pen.)
Y.: Varga (1.), Pirka (97.), N. Tóth (103.), Kozmér (114.) – Rebryk (26.), G. Tóth (30.), Bárányos (47.), Dlusztus (55.)
R.: Pirka (100.) – Supic (76.), Dlusztus (109.)

References

External links
 Stadium
 Eufo
 Official Website
 UEFA
 fixtures and results

2010–11
Hungarian football clubs 2010–11 season